Manuela Sonzogni (born 30 June 1985) is an Italian professional racing cyclist. She rides for the Servetto Footon team.

See also
 List of 2015 UCI Women's Teams and riders

References

External links

1985 births
Living people
Italian female cyclists
Place of birth missing (living people)